The  is a monorail electric multiple unit (EMU) train type operated by the Tokyo Monorail on the Tokyo Monorail Haneda Airport Line in Japan since July 2014.

Design
The body design is based on the earlier 2000 series trains first built in 1997, and uses friction stir welded (FSW) aluminium alloy panels.

Formation
, the fleet consists of seven six-car sets, numbered 10011 to 10071, and formed as shown below, with four motored ("M") cars and two non-powered trailer ("T") cars. Car 1 is at the  end.

 "x" stands for the set number.
 Cars 1 and 6 each have a wheelchair space.

Interior
Passenger accommodation consists of a mixture of facing 4-seat bays and longitudinal bench seating, and includes luggage racks next to the doorways. The seats are covered in a blue moquette incorporating the traditional Japanese  pattern. LED lighting is used throughout. Passenger information is provided by 7-inch wide LCD displays above the doorways. Information is provided in four languages: Japanese, English, Chinese, and Korean. Initially one screen is provided above each doorway, but provision is made for installing a second screen in the future.

History
The first set, 10011, was delivered to Tokyo Monorail's Showajima Depot in March 2014. It entered revenue service on 18 July 2014.

Structural damage 
On 31 May 2022, structural cracks were discovered on seven 10000 series trainsets, causing a reduction in peak-hour service from every four minutes to every five minutes. The cracks were mainly found on an aluminum part which connects the body of the vehicle to the bogie.

References

External links

 September 2013 press release 

Electric multiple units of Japan
10000 series
Train-related introductions in 2014
750 V DC multiple units
Hitachi multiple units